The Sag Harbor State Golf Course is , 9-hole golf facility is located in the middle of a  parcel known as the Barcelona Neck Natural Resources Management Area. The golf course is entirely located in the town of East Hampton in Suffolk County, New York, United States.

The course first opened in 1926 and was run by a group of volunteers for over half a century.  The property was acquired by the New York State Department of Environmental Conservation in 1989. The course was taken over by the New York State Office of Parks, Recreation and Historic Preservation in 1997.

References

External links
New York State Parks Page on Golf Course
Google Map

East Hampton (town), New York
State parks of New York (state)
Golf clubs and courses in New York (state)
Parks in Suffolk County, New York
1926 establishments in New York (state)
Sports venues in Suffolk County, New York